Charles William Parker (December 20, 1912 – June 11, 1997) was a clergyman and political figure in British Columbia, Canada. He represented Peace River from 1952 to 1956 in the Legislative Assembly of British Columbia as a Social Credit member.

He was born the son of John Parker and Anne Fido, and was educated in Calgary. In 1939, he married Christina Mary McDonald. Parker was a minister for the Church of the Nazarene. He ran unsuccessfully for reelection in the provincial riding of Cowichan-Newcastle in 1956. He died on June 11, 1997 in Saanichton, British Columbia.

References 

1912 births
1997 deaths
British Columbia Social Credit Party MLAs
Politicians from Calgary